Adrian Grbić (born 4 August 1996) is an Austrian professional footballer who plays as a forward for French  club Valenciennes on loan from Lorient, and the Austria national team.

Club career
On 8 July 2020, Grbić signed a five-year contract with Ligue 1 club Lorient. The deal was reportedly worth around €10 million. He scored a goal from a penalty on his debut with Lorient in a 3–1 win against Strasbourg on 23 August 2020. On 11 January 2022, Grbić signed for Dutch club Vitesse on loan until the end of the 2021–22 season. On 31 January 2023, Grbić was loaned to Valenciennes in Ligue 2 for the rest of the season.

International career
Grbić was born in Austria and is of Croatian descent. He is a youth international for Austria. Three weeks after his 24th birthday, on 25 August 2020, he was first called up to the Austria national football team for the Nations League games against Norway and Romania. He made his debut on 4 September 2020 in a game against Norway.

Career statistics

Scores and results list Austria's goal tally first, score column indicates score after each Grbić goal.

References

External links
 

1996 births
Living people
Association football forwards
Austrian footballers
Austria youth international footballers
Austria under-21 international footballers
Austria international footballers
Austrian people of Croatian descent
2. Liga (Austria) players
3. Liga players
Ligue 1 players
Ligue 2 players
Eredivisie players
VfB Stuttgart players
VfB Stuttgart II players
Floridsdorfer AC players
Clermont Foot players
FC Lorient players
SBV Vitesse players
Valenciennes FC players
Austrian expatriate footballers
Expatriate footballers in Germany
Expatriate footballers in France
Expatriate footballers in the Netherlands
Austrian expatriate sportspeople in Germany
Austrian expatriate sportspeople in France
Austrian expatriate sportspeople in the Netherlands